Luca Bigi (born 19 April 1991) is an Italian professional rugby union player who primarily plays hooker for Zebre Parma of the United Rugby Championship. He has also represented Italy at international level, having made his test debut against Scotland during the 2017 Summer Internationals. Bigi has previously played for clubs such as Valorugby Emilia, Viadana, Petrarca, and Benetton in the past.

Professional career 
Bigi was playing with Viadana and Petrarca Padova, when he caught the eye of the Benetton staff and signed with the Pro12 side in 2015.  He played with Benetton until 2018–19 Pro14 season.

In 2015 Bigi was named in the Emerging Italy squad for the 2015 World Rugby Tbilisi Cup.

Bigi forced his way into the starting lineup and earned his first test call up in 2017 Italy squad.
In 2018, he impressed Italy head coach Conor O'Shea, in his first season of test rugby, earning 6 Test caps for his country and earned a spot in Italy's 2018 Six Nations squad. Bigi was also named in the 2019 Six Nations squad, having had 3 previous appearances.

On 18 August 2019, Bigi was named in the final 31-man squad for the 2019 Rugby World Cup.

In January 2020, Bigi was named Captain of Italy squad for 2020 Six Nations in substitution of Sergio Parisse. He was captain until 2021 Six Nations.

References

External links 

1991 births
Living people
Italian rugby union players
Italy international rugby union players
Rugby union hookers
Sportspeople from Reggio Emilia
Rugby Viadana players
Petrarca Rugby players
Benetton Rugby players
Zebre Parma players